John Walter McCahill (born February 12, 1955) is a Canadian retired professional ice hockey defenceman who played in one National Hockey League game for the Colorado Rockies during the 1977–78 NHL season.

Career statistics

Regular season and playoffs

See also
List of players who played only one game in the NHL

External links

1955 births
Living people
Canadian expatriate ice hockey players in the United States
Canadian ice hockey defencemen
Colorado Rockies (NHL) players
Fort Worth Texans players
Ice hockey people from Ontario
Michigan Wolverines men's ice hockey players
Muskegon Mohawks players
Philadelphia Firebirds (AHL) players
Sportspeople from Sarnia
Tulsa Oilers (1964–1984) players
Undrafted National Hockey League players